Brock's Bridge is a road bridge in Bristol, UK that crosses the River Avon.

History 

In March 2016, the bridge was officially named Brock's Bridge, after William Brock. A plaque was unveiled on 16 March. However, the bridge is not yet open.

Design 
It was assembled from site from 137 pieces of steel.

References 

Bridges completed in 2016
Bridges in Bristol
2016 establishments in England